In statistics, more specifically in biostatistics, line-intercept sampling (LIS) is a method of sampling elements in a region whereby an element is sampled if a chosen line segment, called a “transect”, intersects the element.

Line intercept sampling has proven to be a reliable, versatile, and easy to implement method to analyze an area containing various objects of interest. It has recently also been applied to estimating variances during particulate material sampling.

References

See also 

 Sampling (statistics)

Sampling techniques
Environmental statistics

sl:Metoda linijskega transekta